Pearloid is a plastic that is intended to resemble mother of pearl. It is commonly used in making musical instruments, especially for pickguards, electric guitar inlays, and accordions.

Production
Pearloid is produced by swirling together chunks of celluloid in a solvent, then curing, which gives it a mother of pearl effect. It is sliced and bonded to or inlaid in other materials, such as the wood of guitar necks.

Use
Pearloid is used in any context where genuine mother of pearl or abalone might be used, as it is much cheaper and doesn't deplete the supply of the natural material. Gibson uses it as a substitute for the mother of pearl inlays in the fretboards on most of its guitars. Various colored versions are often used on items intended to have a retro appearance.

See also
Imitation pearl
Cultured pearl

References

Plastics
Thermoplastics
Cellulose
Pearls